Melzer (German, derived from Mälzer, meaning "malter") is an occupational surname. It may refer to:

Gerald Melzer (born 1990), Austrian tennis player
Hagen Melzer (born 1959), German long-distance runner 
 (1904–1960), German anti-Nazi activist
Iveta Benešová (known professionally as Iveta Melzer; born 1983), Czech tennis player
Jean Melzer (born 1926), Australian senator
Jürgen Melzer (born 1981), Austrian tennis player
Manfred Melzer (born 1944), German bishop
Richard Melzer (born 1979), American basketball player 
Václav Melzer (1878–1968), Czech mycologist
Werner Melzer (born 1954), German footballer

German-language surnames
Occupational surnames